Black Snow may refer to:

Ash
Black Snow (1965 film), a 1965 film directed by Tetsuji Takechi
Black Snow (1990 film), a 1990 Chinese film
Black Snow (1990 US film), a 1990 American film starring Jane Badler
Black Snow, a 2022 crime drama tv series co-produced by Stan and Sundance Now
Black Snow (2017 film), a 2017 Argentine-Spanish film
Black Snow (novel), a 1967 comedic novel by Mikhail Bulgakov
 Black Snow (play), a dramatization by Keith Reddin
Black Snows, a 1962 novel by Zaim Topčić
Black Snow, a 1993 novel by Liu Heng
Black Snow (Fleurety album), a 1993 album by Fleurety
"Black Snow", a 2018 song by Oneohtrix Point Never from Age Of
A ring name used by wrestler Booker T